"Look in My Eyes" is a song written by Richie Barrett and by the American R&B female group The Chantels. It peaked at #14 on the Billboard Hot 100 and at #6 on the Hot R&B Sides in 1961.

Weekly charts

References

1961 songs
1961 singles
The Chantels songs
Songs written by Richie Barrett